Mohd Zharif Hasna (born 9 December 1986) is a Malaysian footballer who plays as a striker for Penang FA.

He started his footballing career with Terengganu FA. A year later, he moved to another team in Terengganu with T-Team F.C., before joining Penang FA in 2013.

External links
 Mohd Zharif Hasna Profile

References

1985 births
Living people
Malaysian footballers
People from Terengganu
Malaysian people of Malay descent
Association football midfielders
Terengganu FC players
Terengganu F.C. II players
Penang F.C. players